Enar "Âseleexpressen" Josefsson (6 September 1916 – 18 December 1989) was a Swedish cross-country skier who won a bronze medal in the 4 × 10 km relay at the 1952 Winter Olympics in Oslo. He won three more medals at the 1950 FIS Nordic World Ski Championships with a gold in the 4 × 10 km relay and silvers in the 18 km and 50 km events.

Josefsson was born in a family of seven siblings, and started working as a forester in his teens to support the family. During his career he won 87 races and was second in 48. He won only one individual national title, in 1952 in the 30 km.

Cross-country skiing results
All results are sourced from the International Ski Federation (FIS).

Olympic Games
 1 medal – (1 bronze)

World Championships
 3 medals – (1 gold, 2 silver)

References

External links

1916 births
1989 deaths
People from Åsele Municipality
Cross-country skiers from Västerbotten County
Olympic cross-country skiers of Sweden
Swedish male cross-country skiers
Cross-country skiers at the 1952 Winter Olympics
Olympic bronze medalists for Sweden
Olympic medalists in cross-country skiing
FIS Nordic World Ski Championships medalists in cross-country skiing
Medalists at the 1952 Winter Olympics